The 2004 Spanish Formula Three Championship was the fourth Spanish Formula Three season. It began on 25 April at Albacete and ended on 14 November at Circuit de Catalunya in Montmeló after fourteen races. Borja García was crowned series champion.

Teams and drivers
 All teams were Spanish-registered. All cars were powered by Toyota engines, Dallara F300 chassis and Dunlop tyres.

† From the second round, CLM Motorsport retired and were purchased by Meycom Sport.

Calendar

Notes

Standings

Drivers' standings
Points were awarded as follows:

† — Drivers did not finish the race, but were classified as they completed over 90% of the race distance.

Teams' standings

Trofeo Ibérico de Fórmula 3

References

External links
 Official Site

Formula Three season
Euroformula Open Championship seasons
Spanish
Spanish F3